Abu Darda (also Romanized as Abū Dardā) is a village in Kamal Rud Rural District, Qolqol Rud District, Tuyserkan County, Hamadan Province, Iran. At the 2006 census, its population was 55, in 12 families.

References 

Populated places in Tuyserkan County